Puppets of Fate is a 1933 British crime film directed by George A. Cooper and starring Godfrey Tearle, Isla Bevan, Russell Thorndike, and Fred Groves. It was shot at Twickenham Studios in London as a quota quickie for release by United Artists. In the United States it was released under the title Wolves of the Underworld.

Cast
 Godfrey Tearle as Richard Sabine
 Isla Bevan as Joan Harding
 Russell Thorndike as Doctor Munroe
 Fred Groves as Arthur Brandon
 Michael Hogan as  Gilbert Heath
 Kynaston Reeves as John Heath
 Roland Culver as Billy Oakhurst
 John Turnbull as Superintendent Desabine

References

Bibliography
 Chibnall, Steve. Quota Quickies: The Birth of the British 'B' Film. British Film Institute, 2007.
 Low, Rachael. Filmmaking in 1930s Britain. George Allen & Unwin, 1985.
 Wood, Linda. British Films, 1927-1939. British Film Institute, 1986.

External links

1933 films
1933 crime films
British black-and-white films
British crime films
1930s English-language films
1930s British films
Quota quickies
United Artists films
Films directed by George A. Cooper
Films shot at Twickenham Film Studios